KQDR (107.3 FM, "Hot 107.3 FM") is a radio station licensed to serve Savoy, Texas, United States. The station is owned by Prophecy Radio Group, LLC.

KQDR broadcasts a contemporary hits music format to the Sherman-Denison metropolitan area.

The station was assigned the call sign KQDR by the Federal Communications Commission on July 26, 2007.

On September 1, 2012 KQDR changed their format from adult hits (as "Doc FM") to contemporary hits, branded as "Hot 107.3".

References

External links

QDR
Contemporary hit radio stations in the United States
Fannin County, Texas
Radio stations established in 2008